Óscar Iván Conde Chourio (born 6 June 2002) is a Venezuelan footballer who plays as a defender for Academia Puerto Cabello.

Career statistics

Club

Notes

International

References

2002 births
Living people
Venezuelan footballers
Venezuela youth international footballers
Venezuela international footballers
Association football defenders
Academia Puerto Cabello players
Sportspeople from Maracay
21st-century Venezuelan people